Chipiyana Buzurg is an urban village in the Indian state of Uttar Pradesh, located in district Gautam Buddha Nagar . It is situated adjacent to NH 24 and just 500 meters away from ABES IT college.  

The Chipiyana Buzurg urban village has two ponds, the first pond is for fishing and the second famous pond is dog bite pond, it's an ancient belief that when anybody gets bitten by a dog, they can get cured if they take a bath in the pond.  

Delhi Merrut Exp Way is just 700 meters from this place. 

This is a developing area and a lot of people stay here who want to have their own house. Samrat Ray resides here, fyi..!!

Transportation
The railway station at Chipiyana Buzurg is closest to the village. Ghaziabad Junction railway station is about 5 km away. Shaheed Sthal Metro station is about 7 km away and Noida electronic city is about 8 km from Chipiyana Buzurg.

References

https://www.greaternoidaauthority.in/chapchip24717

Villages in Gautam Buddh Nagar district

Noida